Siege is a video game released by Mindcraft in 1992 for MS-DOS. An expansion pack, Dogs of War, was released. It added multiplayer, six new castles, and 16 new units to the game. A sequel, Ambush at Sorinor, was released in 1993.

Plot
Set in the world of Mindcraft's The Magic Candle, Siege is a castle-combat war game in which the player controls either the hordes of darkness (orcs, trolls, domugs, tekhirs, and the like) or the warriors of good (humans, dwarves, and elves), either attacking or defending one of four castles in Western Gurtex. The player manages elite troops, berserkers, sergeants, and engineers in the campaign, as well as various assault and defense machines (such as ballistae, burning oil, battering rams, mobile bridges, siege towers, assault ladders, and catapults)and magicians to hurl spells at the enemy. The game features 24 different scenarios, and comes with an editor to allow the players to make new scenarios, or modify those included.

Reception

Computer Gaming World in 1992 complimented Sieges "beautifully rendered" VGA graphics and scenario editor, and approved of it being the first game based on castle warfare. The magazine criticized the lack of detail in win conditions and a too-predictable AI opponent, but concluded that the game "is an all-around unique and engaging simulation ... If the computer AI had more of a cruel streak, the game would be outstanding". In a 1993 survey of pre 20th-century strategy games the magazine gave the game two-plus stars out of five. The game was reviewed in 1993 in Dragon #189 by Hartley, Patricia, and Kirk Lesser in "The Role of Computers" column. The reviewers gave the game 4 out of 5 stars.

Niko Nirvi of Pelit summarized: "AI is a bit weak, but the violence, playability and digitized effects make this an excellent strategy game." He reviewed also the expansion and said: "The best thing about Dogs of War is the opportunity to play Siege against other human players. Wow!" He also praised the improved AI.

Reviews
ASM (Aktueller Software Markt) - Oct, 1992
PC Games (Germany) - Oct, 1992
Computer Gaming World - Jun, 1993
The Good Old Days (Staff Reviews only) (Feb 26, 2014)
Power Play (Sep, 1992)
Joker Verlag präsentiert: Sonderheft (1993)

References

External links
Siege at MobyGames

1992 video games
DOS games
DOS-only games
Mindcraft games
Strategy video games
Video games developed in the United States
Video games set in castles
Video games with expansion packs